Rafal Korc (born 9 March 1982) is a Paralympic athlete from Poland who competes in T20 classification middle-distance running events. Korc represented Poland at the 2012 Summer Paralympics in London, where he won bronze in the 1500 m race. He has been selected for three IPC Athletics World Championships, but he has been unable to replicate his Paralympic Games success, with his best finish being 5th at the 2013 Games in Lyon.

References 

Paralympic athletes of Poland
Athletes (track and field) at the 2012 Summer Paralympics
Paralympic bronze medalists for Poland
Living people
1982 births
Polish male middle-distance runners
Medalists at the 2012 Summer Paralympics
Athletes from Warsaw
Paralympic medalists in athletics (track and field)
Medalists at the World Para Athletics European Championships
21st-century Polish people